James Emanuel (born June 15, 1921 – September 28, 2013) was a poet and scholar from Alliance, Nebraska. Emanuel, who is ranked by some critics as one of the best and most neglected poets of the 20th century, published more than 300 poems, 13 individual books, an influential anthology of African-American literature, an autobiography, and more. He is also credited with creating a new literary genre, jazz-and-blues haiku, often read with musical accompaniment.

Life

Born in Nebraska in 1921, Emanuel was raised in the state. He spent his early years in the western United States where he worked at a variety of jobs. At age twenty he joined the United States Army and served as confidential secretary to the Assistant Inspector General of the U.S. Army Benjamin O. Davis, Sr. After his discharge, he did his undergraduate work at Howard University and obtained graduate degrees from Northwestern University (M.A.) and Columbia University (Ph.D.). He then moved to New York City, where he taught at the City College of New York (CUNY), where in the 1960s he taught the college's first class on African-American poetry and mentored future scholars such as Addison Gayle Jr.

Emanuel also worked as an  editor, with his first editorial project being the publication of a collection of poetry by Langston Hughes, whom Emanuel considered his mentor.

As the years passed Emanuel became frustrated with the state of racism in America. On being offered teaching positions at universities in Europe in the late 1960s, he moved overseas. When his only child, James A. Emanuel, Jr., committed suicide in Los Angeles two decades later, after being beaten by, in Emanuel's words "three cowardly cops," he vowed never to return to the United States.
Emanuel eventually taught at the University of Toulouse (as a Fulbright scholar in 1968–1969), at the University of Grenoble, and at the University of Warsaw. He was living in Paris, France, at the time of his death.

Writings

Poetry

Emanuel was a poet, scholar, and critic. As a poet, he published more than 300 poems and 13 individual books. Emanuel has been called one of the best, and most overlooked, poets of his time. Critics have put forward several reasons for Emanuel's poetry being neglected by the larger literary world, including the fact that he wrote more traditional poetic forms, that he left the United States, and the fact that he refused to take part in the politically correct world of Black academia.

Emanuel is also credited with creating a new literary genre, jazz-and-blues haiku, which he read to musical accompaniment throughout Europe and Africa. For this creation he was awarded the Sidney Bechet Creative Award in 1996. Emanuel was also awarded the Dean's Award for Distinguished Achievement in 2007 from Columbia University's Graduate School of Arts and Sciences and was also honored with a John Hay Whitney Award, a Saxton Memorial Fellowship, and a Special Distinction Award from the Black American Literature Forum.

Criticism and letters

In addition to his poetry, Emanuel also edited (with Theodore Gross) the influential anthology of African American literature Dark Symphony: Negro Literature in America. The anthology, published in 1968 by Free Press, was one of the first major collections of African-American writings. This anthology, and Emanuel's work as an educator, heavily influenced the birth of the African-American literature genre.

In 2000 a collection of Emanuel letters and writings were placed in the United States Library of Congress. Included among the papers was correspondence with Gwendolyn Brooks, Ralph Ellison, Benjamin O. Davis, Ossie Davis, W. E. B. Du Bois, and many others.

Emanuel also edited five Broadside Critics books (1971–1975) and wrote a number of critical essays. His other published works include a memoir, The Force and the Reckoning, published in 2001.

Bibliography

Langston Hughes (New York: Twayne. 192 pp.)
Dark Symphony: Negro Literature in America with Theodore L. Gross (New York: Free Press. 604 pp.)
The Treehouse and Other Poems (Detroit: Broadside Press. 24 pp.)
Panther Man (Detroit: Broadside Press. 32 pp.)
 How I Write/2 with MacKinlay Kantor and Lawrence Osgood (New York: Harcourt Brace Jovanovich. 256 pp.)
Black Man Abroad: The Toulouse Poems(Detroit: Lotus Press. 76 pp.)
A Chisel in the Dark (Poems Selected and New) (Detroit: Lotus Press. 73 pp.)
A Poet's Mind (New York: Regents. 85pp.)
The Broken Bowl (New and Collected Poems) (Detroit: Lotus Press. 85 pp.)
Deadly James and Other Poems (Detroit: Lotus Press. 82 pp.)
The Quagmire Effect
Whole Grain: Collected Poems, 1958–1989 (Detroit: Lotus Press. 396 pp.)
De la rage au cœur with Jean Migrenne and Michel Fabre (Thaon, France: Amiot/Lenganey. 173 pp.)
Blues in Black and White
Reaching for Mumia: 16 Haiku
Jazz from the Haiku King
The Force and the Reckoning

References

External links
 James Emanuel's homepage
 Dan Schneider, "Whole Grain: The Collected Poems of James A. Emanuel", The Simon,  February 16, 2006.
Anthony Zanetti, Review of Whole Grain: The Collected Poems of James A. Emanuel, December 3, 2007.
 Emanuel's The Negro
 Online audio interview with Emanuel
 Nebraska-Born Poet Finds Fame Overseas by Avishay Artsy, Nebraska Public Radio interview with Emanuel

African-American poets
People from Alliance, Nebraska
1921 births
2013 deaths
Howard University alumni
Writers from Nebraska
Northwestern University alumni
Columbia University alumni
City College of New York faculty
Academic staff of the University of Toulouse
Academic staff of Grenoble Alpes University
Academic staff of the University of Warsaw
American expatriates in France
20th-century American poets
20th-century African-American writers
21st-century African-American people
United States Army personnel of World War II
American expatriates in Poland
Fulbright alumni